William Clark & Sons is the oldest linen mill in Northern Ireland and the textile company founded in Maghera, County Londonderry in 1736.

The main product is a fine linen canvas for the tailoring industry, used is a unique process of beetling - pounding of the fabric to flatten it.

In February 2017 a fire destroyed one of the factory buildings, but the production was intact.

The Mills power source was from the Knockoneil River which is an artery of the Clady River.

See also 
Henokiens

References 

Article contains translated text from William Clark & Sons on the French Wikipedia retrieved on 1 May 2017.

External links 
Homepage
Location on Google Maps

Linen industry in Ireland
Textile companies of Ireland
Henokiens companies
Manufacturing companies established in 1736
Companies established in 1736
1730s establishments in Ireland
18th-century establishments in Ireland